Zieria alata is a plant in the citrus family Rutaceae and is only found on mountains in the Mossman and Daintree areas in Queensland. It is an open shrub with wiry, lumpy branches, three-part leaves and small, white, cream-coloured or pale pink flowers in small groups, each with four petals and four stamens.

Description
The leaflets have a distinct mid-vein on the lower surface and a few teeth on their sides near the tip.

The groups are shorter than the leaves and usually only one to three flowers are open at the same time.

Taxonomy and naming
Zieria alata was first formally described in 2007 by Marco Duretto and Paul Forster from a specimen collected in the "North Mary Logging Area, State Forest 143" and the description was published in Austrobaileya. The specific epithet (alata) is a Latin word meaning "winged".

Distribution and habitat

Conservation
This zieria is not listed under the Queensland Nature Conservation Act 1992.

References

External links
 

alata
Sapindales of Australia
Flora of Queensland
Taxa named by Marco Duretto
Plants described in 2007
Taxa named by Paul Irwin Forster